Aristide Stanislas Joseph Rompré (1 August 1912 – 29 September 1976) was a Canadian businessman and politician. Rompré served as a Progressive Conservative party member of the House of Commons of Canada. Born in Saint-Ubalde, Quebec, he was a furniture merchant by career.

Rompré served as mayor of Saint-Ubalde from 1949 to 1951, and again from 1953 to 1960.

After an unsuccessful attempt to unseat Pierre Gauthier at Portneuf in the 1957 federal election, Rompré won the riding in the following year's election. After completing his only federal term, the 24th Canadian Parliament, he left federal politics and did not campaign in another national election.

Electoral record

References

External links
 

1912 births
1976 deaths
Members of the House of Commons of Canada from Quebec
Progressive Conservative Party of Canada MPs
People from Capitale-Nationale
Mayors of places in Quebec